Petit-Rocher is a formerly incorporated Canadian village in Gloucester County, New Brunswick. Sitting on the western shore of both Chaleur Bay and Nepisiguit Bay 20 km northwest of Bathurst, Petit-Rocher's residents are 89% Francophone.

History

The village was founded in 1797 by Acadian settlers. The name literally means 'little rock', and is pronounced by most anglophones in the region as Petty Roche. The name of the village is reputed to derive from the fact that the village's founders disembarked on a small rock. The village was named Little Roche from 1850 to 1854, then Madisco until 1870, and then Petit Rocher. The hyphenated form Petit-Rocher was adopted in 2009. Some old maps have the name Petite Roche (1812) and Sainte Roque or Little Russia (1827).

On 1 January 2023, Petit-Rocher amalgamated with Beresford, Nigadoo, Pointe-Verte and all or part of ten local service districts to form the new town of Belle-Baie. The community's name remains in official use.

Demographics

Language

Tourism
In 2012 and 2013, Petit-Rocher was host to the CCBHA's annual ball hockey tournament with a team from nearby Dundee taking home the Allen, Paquet & Arseneau cup as champions for both tournaments.

Notable people

See also
List of lighthouses in New Brunswick
List of communities in New Brunswick

References

External links
 Acadie-Bathurst. Petit-Rocher

Communities in Gloucester County, New Brunswick
Former villages in New Brunswick
Local service districts of Gloucester County, New Brunswick
Lighthouses in New Brunswick